This is an incomplete list of pickup trucks that are currently in production (as of April 2021).

This list also includes off-roader, sport, luxury, and hybrid trucks, both discontinued and still in production. Also, some vehicles are sold under different brands, therefore some vehicles may be listed more than once but usually link to the same page.  Different countries/continents may also classify vehicles differently; for example, the Nissan Navara name is known throughout most of the world, but in the United States and Canada, its sold as the Nissan Frontier, and in Mexico it's sold as the Nissan NP300.

Current

Current: chassis cab

Below are vehicles manufactured in chassis cab configuration only. While they can be fitted with pickup beds, they are not strictly considered pickup trucks.

Current aftermarket manufactured

All manufacturers below are secondary suppliers that take OEM vehicles to modify and resell.

Discontinued

Concept models

References

External links

 List
Lists of vehicles
Truck-related lists